The Trelawny Pitbulls were the Conference League team of the Trelawny Tigers speedway club. The Pitbulls operated for one season in 2003 until the Trelawny Tigers promotion closed. The team entered the Conference Trophy.

Notable riders
Ben Barker
Malcolm Holloway

References

Defunct British speedway teams
Sport in Cornwall